Robert S. Tine (1954–2019) was an American author of thriller and science fiction novels. He is best known for his pulp post-apocalyptic series "The Outrider", which he published under the pseudonym Richard Harding. He also penned several movie novelizations based on a slew of 80s and 90s blockbusters including Footloose, Basic Instinct and Universal Soldier.

Life
He was born Robert S. Tine in Providence, Rhode Island, and he grew up in Barrington, the Bahamas, Wales, South Africa, Swaziland, and Argentina.  He was a graduate of Columbia University in New York.  He also lived in Italy in the 1980s, where two of his novels were set: State of Grace (1980) and Black Market (1992).

In 2005 he moved from New York to Newburyport, Massachusetts, where he died in 2019.

Work
Throughout his life Tine published six novels of mainstream fiction, the latter of which garnered good reviews—particularly Black Market, set during the liberation of Rome in 1944. Publishers Weekly, in its review of Black Market, called Tine "a genius at characterization."

However, Tine's larger output by far was in the field of novelizations from movies (mostly science fiction, action, and neo-noir, but also four tie-ins to the John Hughes' Beethoven franchise) and TV shows such as JAG and Touched by an Angel.

"The Outrider"
Tine is most remembered today for his hard-boiled "Outrider" series, comprising five mass-market survival fiction novels published by Pinnacle in 1984 and 1985 under the pseudonym Richard Harding (not to be confused with author and war reporter Richard Harding Davis, 1864–1916).

Heavily inspired by George Miller's 1979 film Mad Max, "The Outrider" series is set in what is left of a dystopian United States following a nuclear apocalypse. The hero, the lonesome, rugged survivalist Bonner, is based in the ruins of Chicago, although his adventures take him through much of the ravaged country. He has been compared with other vigilante types such as those in Jerry Ahern's Survivalist and Defender series, James Axler's Deathlands and Outlanders series, and D.B. Drumm's Traveler. Instead of being on the search of loved ones, however, Bonner is "more like the stereotypical retired gunslinger who still finds himself pulled into one job or another."  Each story is awash with pulpy clichés, machismo, and gory action scenes. Genre fans hold the series in high regard.

The fifth and last book in the series actually ends with the announcement of a sixth entry, titled Black Death. It was never published due to Pinnacle's bankruptcy in 1985.

"The Outrider" series was included as a feature presentation on the January 5th, 2018 episode of the Library at the End of the World podcast.

Partial bibliography

External links

References

20th-century American novelists
American male novelists
1954 births
2019 deaths
People from Providence, Rhode Island
People from Newburyport, Massachusetts
Columbia University alumni
20th-century American male writers